Qingcheng Park, formerly People's Park, is an urban public park in central Hohhot, the capital of Inner Mongolia Autonomous Region in North China. It is one of the major tourist sites in Hohhot.

History
The park was established in July 1931 as Dragon Spring Park (Longquan Park) on Reclining Dragon Hill (Wolong Gang), a sacred site connected with some shrines. In 1950, the new People's Republic of China government renewed the area and renamed it People's Park. The park's name was changed again in June 1997 to Qingcheng Park.

See also
Five Pagoda Temple (Hohhot) near the park

References

Parks in Inner Mongolia
Urban public parks
Hohhot
Tourist attractions in Inner Mongolia
1931 establishments in China